North Tyneside is a metropolitan borough in the metropolitan county of Tyne and Wear, England. It forms part of the greater Tyneside conurbation. North Tyneside Council is headquartered at Cobalt Park, Wallsend.

North Tyneside is bordered by Newcastle upon Tyne to the west, the North Sea to the east, the River Tyne to the south and Northumberland to the north. Within its bounds are the towns of Wallsend, North Shields, Killingworth and Whitley Bay, which form a continuously built-up area contiguous with Newcastle.

History

The borough was formed on 1 April 1974 by the merger of the county borough of Tynemouth, with the borough of Wallsend, part of the borough of Whitley Bay, the urban district of Longbenton and part of the urban district of Seaton Valley, all of which were in Northumberland. Killingworth was built as a new town in the 1960s and became part of North Tyneside.

Geography
The following places are located in North Tyneside:

Annitsford
Backworth
Battle Hill
Benton
Burradon
Camperdown
Cullercoats
Dudley
Earsdon
Forest Hall
Holystone
Howdon
Killingworth
Longbenton
Meadow Well
Monkseaton
Moorside
Murton
New York
North Shields
Northumberland Park
Palmersville
Percy Main
Preston
Seaton Burn
Shiremoor
Tynemouth
Wallsend
Wellfield
West Allotment
West Moor
Whitley Bay
Willington Quay

North Tyneside is split by the A19: the west of the borough is more urban, and is mostly contiguous with the city of Newcastle. The towns in the east of the borough are more separate from the central part of the Newcastle urban area. Many of the most affluent neighbourhoods in Tyne and Wear are found in the coastal part of the borough.

Administration and elections

Unlike most English districts, North Tyneside Council is led by a directly elected mayor; since May 2013, this post has been held by Norma Redfearn of the Labour Party. She was most recently elected on 6 May 2021.

The council has sixty elected members, three from each of the twenty wards in the borough. Elections are staggered into thirds, with one councillor from each ward elected each year for three consecutive years, and the mayoral election held on the fourth year.

Labour has a majority on the council, holding fifty of sixty seats. The Conservatives have nine councillors, all of whom represent wards on or near the coast. Maureen Madden, representing Howdon Ward, is the only independent councillor; she was elected as a Labour candidate in 2018, but has since left the party. Since the 2021 election, the Liberal Democrats have had no representatives on the council.

North Tyneside is part of the North of Tyne combined authority, along with Newcastle and Northumberland, and so additionally elects the Mayor of North of Tyne. Labour's Jamie Driscoll was elected as the first mayor on 2 May 2019, to a four-year term.

Economy

North Tyneside lies in the coalfield that covers the South-East of the historic county of Northumberland.  It has traditionally been a centre of heavy industry along with the rest of Tyneside, with for example the Swan Hunter shipyard in Wallsend, and export of coal. Today most of the heavy industry has gone, leaving high unemployment in some areas (over the borough, 3.2% compared to 2.7% for the UK).

Transport

Two key roads serve North Tyneside:

The A19 which leaves the A1 north of Newcastle and runs through the borough and then through the Tyne Tunnel to South Tyneside, Teesside and towards the South.
The Coast Road (A1058) runs from Newcastle to the coast.  For most of its length it is grade-separated.

North Tyneside is served by 17 stations on the Tyne and Wear Metro on a loop from Newcastle through Wallsend, North Shields, Whitley Bay, Benton and back to Newcastle. Trains operate at least every 15 minutes, with extra services in the peak hours. Most of the stations serving North Tyneside fall into fare zones B and C.

There are no National Rail stations in the borough, despite the East Coast Main Line and Blyth and Tyne routes passing through. The nearest National Rail station is Newcastle, which is also served by the Tyne & Wear Metro.

North Tyneside has an extensive bus network, with most areas benefiting from direct services to Newcastle. Many areas have direct bus services to Cramlington, Blyth or Morpeth. The principle bus operators in the area are Arriva North East (all areas), Go North East (most areas) and Stagecoach in Newcastle (Benton, Forest Hall, Killingworth and Wallsend).

The Shields Ferry links North Shields to South Shields, in South Tyneside.

There is an international ferry terminal at Royal Quays in North Shields, with a service to Amsterdam (IJmuiden).

Places of interest

Segedunum Roman fort is in Wallsend (at the end of Hadrian's wall).
The Stephenson Railway Museum in New York, named after George Stephenson and Robert Stephenson who hailed from Tyneside and lived in West Moor in North Tyneside 1802–1824.
Tynemouth Castle and Priory
 North Tyneside includes coastline covering Tynemouth, Cullercoats and Whitley Bay
 Blue Reef Aquarium in Tynemouth
St. Mary's Island in Whitley Bay
North Shields Fish Quay, Clifford's Fort and the High and Low Lights of North Shields

Media

Radio
Y Radio

Twinned towns
North Tyneside is twinned with:
 Oer-Erkenschwick in Germany
 Halluin in France

References

External links

Archives of North Tyneside (including boroughs of Tynemouth, Wallsend and Whitley Bay and Longbenton) Urban District are preserved and accessible at Tyne and Wear Archives Service 
 Wallsend Town Information regarding the town centre and areas covering Wallsend in North Tyneside can be found here.

 
Metropolitan boroughs of Tyne and Wear